McLaren St. Luke's Hospital is a non-profit hospital in Maumee, Ohio, operated by McLaren Health Care Corporation. The hospital is expected to wind down operations by mid-May, 2023 with assets being purchased by Mercy Health.

Facilities
The hospital is equipped with a helipad for medical evacuation. It acquired the da Vinci robotic surgical system in 2007.

History

William Gillette, a Toledo surgeon, opened a small health clinic in 1898. It expanded into a 50-bed hospital in 1906, opening as the fourth hospital in the Toledo area. Robinwood Hospital was purchased in 1926 by the Federated Lutheran Benevolent Society of Toledo, making it a not-for-profit Christian institution.

The hospital was renamed St. Luke's Hospital in 1951 to emphasize its Christian identity. A lack of space forced the opening of a new site on October 29, 1972. An original capacity of 206 patients was upgraded over 20 years and two expansions, creating the present-day  St. Luke's Hospital.

St. Luke's was the last independent hospital in the Toledo area before joining the ProMedica Health System in 2010 and on July 1, 2016, St. Luke's Hospital became independent once again. In August 2020, St. Luke's Hospital was purchased by McLaren Health Care and the hospital was rebranded as McLaren St. Luke's Hospital. 

In May, 2022, McLaren announced they will be discontinuing labor and delivery services at St. Luke in September, 2022.  

On March 3, 2023, McLaren announced that the hospital will wind down operations by mid-May 2023 citing years of declining revenues and an unstable reimbursement environment. McLaren Health Care and Mercy Health are in the process of finalizing an asset purchase agreement in which Mercy Health will acquire the McLaren St. Luke’s facilities, land, and physical assets, pending final due diligence.

References

External links

Hospital buildings completed in 1906
Hospital buildings completed in 1972
Hospitals in Ohio
1898 establishments in Ohio